George Brian Fincke (November 21, 1953 – December 3, 2016) was an American Anglican bishop of the Reformed Episcopal Church (REC).

Early life
Fincke was born to a Presbyterian minister, the Rev. George W. Fincke Jr., and Mary Louise Patterson Fincke in Camden, New Jersey, in 1953.

Ministry career
He was ordained as a presbyter in 1981 and was received into the Reformed Episcopal Church in 1986. He had an M.Div. from Reformed Episcopal Seminary and served in the Diocese of the Northeast and Mid-Atlantic before his election as bishop ordinary of the nascent Missionary Diocese of the West. In addition to serving as a bishop, Fincke also served as a parish pastor in California.

In October 2000, Fincke suffered a stroke and was substantially disabled. As a result, his office as bishop ordinary of the Missionary Diocese of the West was declared vacant.  After his recovery, Fincke served as an assisting bishop in the Diocese of Mid-America and a rector in Fargo, North Dakota. In 2015, Fincke became rector of an Anglican Province of America congregation in Prescott, Arizona.

Personal life
Fincke was married for 37 years to Ann Caskey. They had three daughters and one son. Fincke died on December 3, 2016, in Prescott.

References

1953 births
2016 deaths
Bishops of the Reformed Episcopal Church
People from Camden, New Jersey
Religious leaders from New Jersey